Minnekhada Regional Park is a natural park situated in northeast Coquitlam, British Columbia, alongside Pitt-Addington Marsh and the Pitt River. It is over 200 hectares in size, and features trails, rock knolls, abundant trees, birds and other wildlife. At the centre of the park is the main marsh area, divided into upper and lower sections, divided by a dike and small footbridge.

There are two main entrances to the park with parking facilities. The Quarry Road entrance serves as the primary trail access point for hikers and bird watchers. The Oliver Road entrance provides access to Minnekhada Lodge, as well as access to some of the trails. There is a secondary entrance in the northwest corner of the park, further north of the Quarry Road entrance, but there is no parking at this location.

There are three primary trails through the park that follow an eastern trajectory towards the Pitt-Addington Marsh boundary:
 Quarry Trail
 Mid-Marsh Trail
 Lodge/Fern Trails

There are five lookout points in the park. Of these, Low Knoll with its full view of the lower marsh, and High Knoll with its . elevation and view of the Pitt River and Pitt Meadows beyond, are among the most popular. A full perimeter trail hike through Quarry Trail, Fern Trail, and Lodge Trail covers a distance of 5.2 km (this does not include excursions to lookout points such as High Knoll and Low Knoll).

Minnekhada Regional Park is a designated Wildlife Watch site.

Minnekhada Lodge
Minnekhada Lodge was built as a country retreat for hunting in 1934 by Lieutenant Governor Eric Hamber. It was donated to the Greater Vancouver Regional District (GVRD) by the provincial government in 1984. The rooms and grounds of the lodge are open to the public on many Sundays throughout the year.

Minnekhada Farm
The Minnekhada Farm was added to the park in 1995. The GVRD is currently restoring its fields and buildings as a heritage estate farm and equestrian centre. There is currently no access to Minnekhada Farm.

External links
 Map of Minnekhada Regional Park
 Vancouver Parks page with photos
 Minnekhada Park history
 Satellite view of Minnekhada Regional Park on Google Maps
 High Knoll Hiking Trail Information

Parks in Coquitlam